Begging for Billionaires is a 2009 American documentary film exposing abuses of eminent domain. The film is directed by Philip Klein. The music for the film was written and performed by Tom Goodkind of the Washington Squares.

References

External links
 
 
 interview with director

2009 films
American documentary films
2009 documentary films
Documentary films about law in the United States
Documentary films about the ruling class
Eminent domain
2000s English-language films
2000s American films